The 2016–17 Indian Women's League final round was played between six teams to decide the champion of Indian Women's League inaugural season. It was held from 28 January to 14 February at the Ambedkar Stadium in New Delhi. The league proper followed a round-robin format with the top four teams advancing to the semifinals.

Eastern Sporting Union and Rising Students entered round by topping their groups in the preliminary round. Alakhpura and Jeppiaar Institute entered after finishing second in their respective groups. Pune City and Aizawl joined them as direct entry teams. Eastern Sporting Union won the final beating Rising Students 3–0.

Teams

Group stage

Knock out stage

Semi-finals

Final

Statistics

Top scorers

Hat-tricks 
Result column shows goal tally of player's team first.

Awards
The following awards were announced at the end of the season, following the final on 14 February:
 Emerging Player: Jabamani Tudu
 Most Valuable Player: Umapati Devi
 Top Scorer: Kamala Devi

References

External links
 Fixtures and results

Indian Women's League
2016–17 in Indian football leagues
2016–17 domestic women's association football leagues